Serafino Cretoni (4 September 1833 – 3 February 1909) was an Italian Cardinal of the Roman Catholic Church who served as Prefect of the Sacred Congregation of Rites from 1903 until his death, and was elevated to the cardinalate in 1896.

Biography
Serafino Cretoni was born in Soriano, and studied at the Pontifical Roman Athenaeum S. Apollinare, where he obtained his doctorate in theology. He also studied and was fluent in English, French, Greek, and Spanish. Ordained to the priesthood in 1857, Cretoni then taught philosophy at the Pontifical Urban Athenaeum of Propaganda Fide in Rome. He also served as Vice-Substitute of the Vatican Secretariat of State, and as Secretary of the commission for Oriental affairs at the First Vatican Council (1869–1870).

Cretoni was named a canon of the Liberian Basilica and of St. Peter's Basilica before becoming Archivist of the Sacred Congregation for the Propagation of the Faith. In 1877, he was sent by Pope Pius IX to attend the general chapter of the Armenian Mechitarists in Venice. Cretoni was raised to the rank of Domestic Prelate of His Holiness on 21 May 1878, and made Undersecretary of State on 19 September 1879. He later became Secretary of the Sacred Congregation for the Propagation of the Faith, in the section of Oriental rites, on 16 November 1880 and Assessor of the Supreme Sacred Congregation of the Holy Office on 20 March 1889.

On 16 January 1893 Simeoni was appointed Titular Archbishop of Damascus by Pope Leo XIII, receiving his episcopal consecration on the following 5 February from Cardinal Raffaele Monaco La Valletta. Simeoni was named Nuncio to Spain on 9 May that year, and created Cardinal Priest of Santa Maria sopra Minerva by Pope Leo in the consistory of 22 June 1896.

From 19 April 1900 to 15 April 1901 he served as Camerlengo of the Sacred College of Cardinals. He was appointed Prefect of the Congregation for Indulgences and Sacred Relics on 23 October 1900 and of the Sacred Congregation of Rites on 7 January 1903. He also participated in the papal conclave of 1903, which selected Pope Pius X.

Cardinal Cretoni died in Rome, at the age of 75. After lying in state in the church of San Carlo ai Catinari, he was buried at the Campo Verano cemetery.

References

External links
Catholic-Hierarchy 
Cardinals of the Holy Roman Church

1833 births
1909 deaths
20th-century Italian cardinals
19th-century Italian Roman Catholic archbishops
20th-century Italian Roman Catholic archbishops
Apostolic Nuncios to Spain
Cardinals created by Pope Leo XIII
19th-century Italian cardinals